Hyderabad Corporation zones, circles and wards are divided by the Greater Hyderabad Municipal Corporation (GHMC) for its planning and development in Hyderabad, India. 
The city of Hyderabad is divided into six zones: Charminar, L. B. Nagar, Serilingampally, Kukatpally, Secunderabad and Khairatabad. Each zone is further divided into circles, thirty in total.  The circles are subdivided into 150 wards, each with around 36,000 people in 2007; which later increased to 40,000 - 50,000 people in 2020. The GHMC is planning to increase the number of wards to 200.

List of wards

References

Wards
Administrative divisions of India by city
Wards